Shams-ud-Din Muzaffar Shah II or Muzafar II, born Khalil Khan, was a Sultan of the Muzaffarid dynasty, who reigned over the Gujarat Sultanate from 1511 to 1526. He was the eldest son of Sultan Mahmud Begada and his Rajput wife, Rani Hírabai.

He subdued the princely state of Idar but came in conflict with Rana Sanga of Mewar when he captured Malwa.

Reign
Mahmud Begada was a prominent ruler of the Muzaffarid dynasty. He had four sons: Khalíl Khan, Muhammad Kala, Apa Khan, and Ahmed Khan. On ascending the throne at the age of twenty-seven, Khalíl adopted the title of Muzaffar Shah.

For some time before his father’s death, Prince Khalíl Khan had been living at Baroda (now Vadodara), and shortly after his accession, he visited that neighborhood and founded a town named Daulatabad. In 1514, Rao Bhím, the son of Rao Bhan of Idar State, defeated Ain-ul-Mulk, governor of Patan, who was coming to Ahmedabad to pay his respects to the king. The officer had turned aside to punish Rao for some disturbance he had created, but failing in his purpose, was himself defeated. When Muzaffar Shah approached, Rao abandoned Idar and made peace by agreeing to pay a heavy tribute. Meanwhile, the king marched to Godhra, and then to Malwa via Dahod and soon after went on to Dhar.

In early 1514, the Portuguese general, Afonso de Albuquerque, sent ambassadors to Muzaffar Shah II to seek permission to build a fort on Diu Island. Although this mission returned without any agreement, diplomatic gifts were exchanged, including an Indian rhinoceros named Genda. Alfonso further passed on Genda along with its Indian keeper to King Manuel I of Portugal. This gift caused quite a sensation in King Manuel's kingdom as nobody had seen a living rhinoceros in Europe. In late 1515, Manuel further sent Genda as a gift to Pope Leo X in Rome, but the ship carrying the animal capsized. The memory of the rhino lived on due to the works of the artist Albrecht Dürer.

Idar

After a short stay in Malwa, seeking to take advantage of the distracted condition of Mahmúd of Malwa, who was at war with his nobles, Muzaffar returned to Muhammadabad (Champaner). At this time, Raimal, nephew of the late Rao Bhím of Ídar, expelled the Rao’s son Bharmal with the aid of his father-in-law, Rana Sanga of Chittor and succeeded to the chieftainship of Ídar.

The king was displeased at the interference of the Rana, and directed Nizam Khan, the governor of Ahmednagar (now Himatnagar), to expel Raimal and reinstate Bharmal. Nizam Khan took Ídar and gave it to Bharmal. Raimal betook himself to the hills where Nizam Khan, incautiously pursuing and engaging him, lost many men.

The Sultan visited Ídar. Shortly after, Nizam Khan, the governor of Ahmednagar, fell sick and was called to court. He left Ídar in charge of Zahír-ul-Mulk at the head of a hundred horse. Raimal made a sudden raid on Ídar and killed Zahír-ul-Mulk and twenty-seven of his men. On hearing this, Muzaffar Shah II ordered Nizam Khan to destroy Bijapur.

Malwa

In 1517, the nobles of Malwa sought Muzaffar Shah's interference, alleging that the minister Medini Rai was planning to depose the Malwa Sultan, Mahmud Khilji II, and usurp the throne. Muzaffar Shah promised to come to their help, and shortly after, Sultan Mahmúd Khilji, escaping from the surveillance of Medani Rai, himself sought the aid of the Gujarat monarch.

In 1518, Muzaffar Shah marched by Godhra into Malwa, and on his arrival at Dhar, that town was evacuated by Medani Rai. The king besieged Mandu, and Medani Rai summoned the Chittor Rana to his aid. When the Rana reached Sarangpur, Muzaffar Shah detached a force caused the Rana to retire, while the Khan's soldiers exerted themselves so strenuously that they captured Mandu, recovering the girdle which Qutb-ud-dín Ahmad Shah II had lost at the battle of Kapadvanj. This conquest virtually placed Malwa in Muzaffar’s power, but he honourably restored the kingdom to Sultan Mahmúd Khilji, and, withdrew from Gujarat, proceeded to Muhammadabad.

In 1519, news was received of the defeat and capture of Sultan Mahmúd Khilji by the Rana of Chittor. Muzaffar Shah sent a force to protect Mandu. But, the Rana, who distinguished himself by releasing the Sultan of Malwa and keeping his son in his stead as a hostage, enjoyed continued good fortune. Sometime before these events, a bard in the presence of Nizam Khan, the governor of Ídar, boasted that the Rana of Chittor would never fail to help Rana Raimal of Ídar. The angry governor explained, "Whose dog is Rana Sanga to help Raimal while we are here?" Nizam Khan chained Rana Sanga in the fort and dared the Rana to carry him away. His successes enabled Sanga to answer the challenge.

In consequence of dissensions at headquarters, Nizam Khan withdrew to Ahmednagar and left a small garrison in Ídar. When Rana Sanga appeared before Ídar, the garrison resisted but were slain. The Rana advanced to Ahmednagar and severely defeated Nizam Khan who withdrew to Ahmedabad, while the Rana plundered Vishalnagar (now Visnagar).

In 1521, Malik Ayyaz Sultani, the governor of Sorath, was sent with a large and carefully equipped force to revenge this inroad. Dissensions between Malik Ayyaz and the nobles of Gujarat prevented this expedition. Muzaffar Shah, greatly displeased with the result, prepared to march against Chittor, when he was dissuaded by a submissive embassy from that chief, who sent his son to Ahmedabad with valuable presents for the king.

Shortly afterwards, on the death of Malik Ayyaz, Muzaffar Shah confirmed his elder son Malik Is-hak in his father’s rank and possessions. Malik Is-hak remained in Sorath, which was confirmed as his jagir. In the following year, the Sultan went about his dominions strengthening his frontier posts, especially the fort of Modasa, which he rebuilt.

Death and succession

Muzaffar Shah II, after formally appointing his son Sikandar Khan his heir, died at Ahmedabad on 5 April 1526 at the age of 51, after a reign of fourteen years and nine months. Before his death, he traveled from Champaner to Baroda and then to Ahmedabad and lived at the palace at Kankaria lake.

Muzaffar Shah was buried in the shrine of Sheikh Ahmed Khattu at Sarkhej Roza near his father’s grave. After Sikandar Shah had been in power for a few months, he was murdered by Imad-ul-Mulk Khush Kadam, who seated a younger brother of Sikandar’s, named Nasir Khan, on the throne with the title of Mahmúd Shah II and governed on his behalf.

The singular event of Sikandar’s reign was the destruction of an army sent against his brother Latíf Khan who was helped by Rana Bhím of Munga (now Chhota Udaipur). The nobles deserted Imad-ul-Mulk’s cause, and prince Bahadur Khan, returning to Gujarat, was joined by many supporters such as Taj Khan, the proprietor of Dhandhuka. Bahadur Khan marched to Champaner, captured and executed Imad-ul-Mulk, poisoned Nasir Khan, and ascended the throne in 1527 with the title of Bahadur Shah.

References

Gujarat sultans
1526 deaths
16th-century Indian monarchs